Kurung may refer to:
 Kurung Kumey district, one of the 17 districts of the northeastern Indian state of Arunachal Pradesh
 Kurung River in Arunachal Pradesh
 Kurung language, see Gurung language
 Baju Kurung, a traditional Malay costume